Dark one or Dark One may refer to:
 Dark Lord, a fictional stock character who is a powerful villain with evil henchmen
 Dark One (Wheel of Time), the primary antagonist in the Wheel of Time series
Dark One (graphic novel), a graphic novel series created by Brandon Sanderson